Klubi i Futbollit Iliria Fushë-Krujë is an Albanian football club based in the small town of Fushë-Krujë.

The club plays its home games at the Redi Maloku Stadium and they currently compete in the Kategoria e Dytë, the third tier of Albanian football.

History
Only founded in 1991, Iliria had one season in the Kategoria Superiore, after they won promotion in 1994. Under manager Fatmir Sala, they were immediately relegated after finishing the 1994–95 season bottom and 10 points from safety.

Current squad

References

Iliria Fushe-Kruje
Iliria
1991 establishments in Albania
Krujë
Kategoria e Dytë clubs